The Barnett Ministry was the 35th Ministry of the Government of Western Australia. It included 13 members of the Liberal Party, three members of the National Party and an independent. It was led by the Premier of Western Australia, Colin Barnett, and Deputy Premier Liza Harvey. It succeeded the Carpenter Ministry on 23 September 2008 following the 2008 election and was succeeded by the First McGowan Ministry following the Liberal Party's defeat at the 2017 election.

First Ministry
The Governor, Ken Michael, designated 17 principal executive offices of the Government under section 43(2) of the Constitution Acts Amendment Act 1899. The following ministers and parliamentary secretaries were then appointed to the positions, and served until the reconstitution of the Ministry on 14 December 2010. The list below is ordered by decreasing seniority within the Cabinet, as indicated by the Government Gazette and the Hansard index. Blue entries indicate members of the Liberal Party, green entries indicate members of the National Party, and grey indicates an Independent.

 On 27 April 2010, Troy Buswell resigned from the ministry following questions arising from a personal affair with Greens MP Adele Carles. The following day, Premier Colin Barnett assumed the role of Treasurer, while Buswell's remaining portfolios were transferred to Bill Marmion, who had hitherto been a parliamentary secretary.

December 2010 reconstitution
On 14 December 2010, a number of changes were made to the Ministry. The most notable were the re-appointment of Troy Buswell to the Ministry as Minister for Transport and Minister for Housing and the promotion of Christian Porter to Treasurer to replace Colin Barnett. The Governor, Ken Michael, designated 17 principal executive offices of the Government under section 43(2) of the Constitution Acts Amendment Act 1899. The following ministers and parliamentary secretaries were then appointed to the positions. The list below is ordered by decreasing seniority within the Cabinet, as indicated by the Government Gazette and the Hansard index. Blue entries indicate members of the Liberal Party, green entries indicate members of the National Party, and grey indicates an Independent. Except where indicated, all ministers served until the next reconstitution on 29 June 2012.

June 2012 reconstitution
On 29 June 2012, the Ministry was reconstituted. This followed the retirement of Liz Constable (Education), the removal of Rob Johnson (Police; Road Safety) and the earlier resignation on 12 June of Christian Porter (Treasurer; Attorney General), whose duties had been temporarily split between Premier Colin Barnett and senior minister Norman Moore. Three new ministers were appointed from amongst the parliamentary secretary ranks, and three new secretaries were appointed to replace them. The list below is ordered by decreasing seniority within the Cabinet, as indicated by the Government Gazette and the Hansard index. Blue entries indicate members of the Liberal Party, while green entries indicate members of the National Party.

March 2013 reconstitution
Following the return of the government at the 2013 state election, held on 9 March, the Ministry was again reconstituted, and was sworn in on 21 March 2013. John Castrilli (Local Government; Heritage; Citizenship and Multicultural Interests) and the retiring Norman Moore (Mines and Petroleum; Fisheries; Electoral Affairs) both resigned their positions, while Simon O'Brien (Finance; Commerce; Small Business), Robyn McSweeney (Child Protection; Community Services; Seniors and Volunteering; Women's Interests; Youth), and Murray Cowper (Training and Workforce Development; Corrective Services) each lost their portfolios. Five new ministers were appointed, including four previous parliamentary secretaries, and seven new parliamentary secretaries were appointed, making eight in total. A new portfolio, that of Minister for Veterans, was created. The list below is ordered by decreasing seniority within the Cabinet, as indicated by the Government Gazette and the Hansard index. Blue entries indicate members of the Liberal Party, while green entries indicate members of the National Party.

March 2016 reconstitution

In December 2015, Kim Hames announced his intention to resign as deputy leader of the Liberal Party (and thus also as deputy premier) with effect from February 2016. Liza Harvey was elected unopposed as his successor, with a resultant ministerial reshuffle that took effect from 31 March 2016. Another reshuffle took place on 22 September 2016, with the resignations of Dean Nalder and Tony Simpson. All ministers are listed in order of seniority.

References

Western Australian ministries
2008 establishments in Australia
2017 disestablishments in Australia
Ministries of Elizabeth II